Chaumié is a surname. Notable people with the surname include:

Joseph Chaumié (1849–1919), French politician 
Pierre Chaumié (1880–1966), French politician